Tattoo It is a 1990 album by American pop / Hi-NRG singer Paul Lekakis. The album was released on Sire Records. It contains the hit single, "Boom Boom (Let's Go Back to My Room)", which Lekakis had previously released in 1987 on Polydor Records. Two of the tracks on the album, "You Blow Me Away" and "My House", were produced by Shep Pettibone. The track "Are You Man Enough" features additional vocals by Lisa Bellamy.

Track listing

References

1990 debut albums
Sire Records albums